Presidential elections were held in Cape Verde on 12 February 2006, the fourth presidential elections since the introduction of multi-party politics in 1990.

In a repeat of the 2001 election, Pedro Pires of the ruling African Party for the Independence of Cape Verde (PAICV) was challenged by former Prime Minister Carlos Veiga of the Movement for Democracy (MpD). In the 2001 presidential run-off, Pires had defeated Veiga by a margin of only 12 votes. In 2006, Pires won another narrow victory, prevailing by about 3,000 votes and slightly surpassing the 50% majority necessary to avoid a run-off.

Results

External links
National Elections Commission 

Presidential elections in Cape Verde
Cape Verde
Presidential
Cape Verde